is a railway station in Jūsō, Yodogawa-ku, Osaka, Japan, operated by the private railway operator Hankyu Railway. The six-track trunk line from Umeda Station diverges into the three double tracks of the Hankyu Kobe Line, the Hankyu Kyoto Line and the Hankyu Takarazuka Line at this station. The area surrounding the station is an extensive shopping and entertainment district.

Station layout
This station has two island platforms and two side platforms serving six tracks on the ground level, enabling to change trains from the Kobe Line for Umeda to the Takarazuka Line for Takarazuka and Minoo on one island platform between Tracks 2 and 3, and from the Takarazuka Line for Umeda to the Kyoto Line for Kyoto (Kawaramachi, Arashiyama) and Kita-Senri on another island platform between Tracks 4 and 5. The platforms are connected by two transfer concourses, one elevated and one underground. The east gate connects directly to platform 6 while the west gate connects directly to platform 1. Several shops and restaurants serving transferring passengers are located inside the station.

There is a returning track in the south of the station between the Kobe Line and the Takarazuka Line. The track is used for the trains for the Kobe Line and the Takarazuka Line running to and from Shojaku Workshop for maintenance, and for seasonal trains running between Kobe or Takarazuka and Arashiyama via the Kobe Line and the Kyoto Line.

Adjacent stations

History
The station opened on 10 March 1910, as a stop on the Minoo-Arima Railway (today's Takarazuka Line). The Kobe Line was added in 1920. In 1921, the North Osaka Electric Railway began service between Juso and Senriyama; this line was acquired by the Keihan Electric Railway and was extended from Awaji Station to both Kyoto and central Osaka. Keihan and Hankyu merged in 1943, bringing all of Juso's lines under common ownership. While Keihan was again spun off as a separate company in 1949, Hankyu retained the Juso-Kyoto and Senriyama lines. Juso served as the terminal of the Kyoto Main Line until 1959, when the line was extended to Umeda.

Station numbering was introduced to all Hankyu stations on 21 December 2013 with this station being designated as station number HK-03.

References

External links
 Juso Station from Hankyu Railway website 

Railway stations in Osaka
Hankyū Kōbe Main Line
Hankyu Railway Takarazuka Line
Hankyu Kyoto Main Line
Railway stations in Japan opened in 1910